Newcastle upon Tyne (RP:), or simply Newcastle, is a city and metropolitan borough in Tyne and Wear, England. The city is located on the River Tyne's northern bank and forms the largest part of the Tyneside built-up area. Newcastle is also the most populous city of North East England. Newcastle developed around a Roman settlement called Pons Aelius and the settlement later took the name of a castle built in 1080 by William the Conqueror's eldest son, Robert Curthose.

Historically, the city's economy was dependent on its port and in particular, its status as one of the world's largest ship building and repair centres. Today, the city's economy is diverse with major economic output in science, finance, retail, education, tourism, and nightlife. Newcastle is one of the UK Core Cities, as well as part of the Eurocities network.

Famous landmarks in Newcastle include the Tyne Bridge; the Swing Bridge; Newcastle Castle; St Thomas’ Church; Grainger Town including Grey's Monument and the Theatre Royal; the Millennium Bridge; St James' Park; and Chinatown. Culturally, Newcastle is famed for its nightlife; bakery chain Greggs; television personalities Ant & Dec; the Great North Run half-marathon; and Newcastle United Football Club.

Newcastle was historically part of the county of Northumberland until 1400, when it became a county in its own right separate from Northumberland. Newcastle and the North Tyneside area of Northumberland, along with some of County Durham south of the city, created the county of Tyne and Wear in 1974. Newcastle is locally governed by Newcastle City Council, part of the North of Tyne Combined Authority.

History

Roman
The first recorded settlement in what is now Newcastle was Pons Aelius ("Hadrian's bridge"), a Roman fort and bridge across the River Tyne. It was given the family name of the Roman Emperor Hadrian, who founded it in the 2nd century AD. This rare honour suggests Hadrian may have visited the site and instituted the bridge on his tour of Britain. The population of Pons Aelius then is estimated at 2,000. Fragments of Hadrian's Wall are visible in parts of Newcastle, particularly along the West Road. The course of the "Roman Wall" can be traced eastwards to the Segedunum Roman fort in Wallsend—the "wall's end"—and to the supply fort Arbeia in South Shields.

Anglo-Saxon and Norman
After the Roman departure from Britain, completed in 410, Newcastle became part of the powerful Anglo-Saxon kingdom of Northumbria, and was known throughout this period as Munucceaster (sometimes modernised as Monkchester).<ref name=Monkchester>{{cite web | last = Mackenzie | first = Eneas | title = Historical Account of Newcastle-upon-Tyne | website = british-history.ac.uk | year = 1827 | url = http://www.british-history.ac.uk/report.aspx?compid=43318 | access-date = 24 November 2008}}</ref>

Conflicts with the Danes in 876 left the settlements along the River Tyne in ruins. After the conflicts with the Danes, and following the 1088 rebellion against the Normans, Monkchester was all but destroyed by Odo of Bayeux.

Because of its strategic position, Robert Curthose, son of William the Conqueror, erected a wooden castle there in the year 1080. The town was henceforth known as Novum Castellum or New Castle. The wooden structure was replaced by a stone castle in 1087. The castle was rebuilt again in 1172 during the reign of Henry II. Much of the keep which can be seen in the city today dates from this period.

Middle Ages
Throughout the Middle Ages, Newcastle was England's northern fortress. In 1400 Newcastle was separated from Northumberland and made a county of itself by Henry IV. Newcastle was given the title of the county of the town of Newcastle upon Tyne. The town had a new charter granted by Elizabeth in 1589. The Scots king William the Lion was imprisoned in Newcastle in 1174, and Edward I brought the Stone of Scone and William Wallace south through the town. Newcastle was successfully defended against the Scots three times during the 14th century.

16th to 19th centuries

From 1530, a royal act restricted all shipments of coal from Tyneside to Newcastle Quayside, giving a monopoly in the coal trade to a cartel of Newcastle burgesses known as the Hostmen. This monopoly, which lasted for a considerable time, helped Newcastle prosper and develop into a major town. The phrase taking coals to Newcastle was first recorded contextually in 1538. The phrase itself means a pointless pursuit.
In the 18th century, the American entrepreneur Timothy Dexter, regarded as an eccentric, defied this idiom. He was persuaded to sail a shipment of coal to Newcastle by merchants plotting to ruin him; however, his shipment arrived on the Tyne during a strike that had crippled local production, allowing him to turn a considerable profit.

In the Sandgate area, to the east of the city, and beside the river, resided the close-knit community of keelmen and their families. They were so called because they worked on the keels, boats that were used to transfer coal from the river banks to the waiting colliers, for export to London and elsewhere. In the 1630s, about 7,000 out of 20,000 inhabitants of Newcastle died of plague, more than one-third of the population. Specifically within the year 1636, it is roughly estimated with evidence held by the Society of Antiquaries that 47% of the then population of Newcastle died from the epidemic; this may also have been the most devastating loss in any British city in this period.

During the English Civil War, the North declared for the King. In a bid to gain Newcastle and the Tyne, Cromwell's allies, the Scots, captured the town of Newburn. In 1644, the Scots then captured the reinforced fortification on the Lawe in South Shields following a siege and the city was besieged for many months. It was eventually stormed ("with roaring drummes") and sacked by Cromwell's allies. The grateful King bestowed the motto "Fortiter Defendit Triumphans" ("Triumphing by a brave defence") upon the town. Charles I was imprisoned in Newcastle by the Scots in 1646–7.

In the 18th century, Newcastle was the country's fourth largest print centre after London, Oxford and Cambridge, and the Literary and Philosophical Society of 1793, with its erudite debates and large stock of books in several languages, predated the London Library by half a century. Some founder members of the Literary and Philosophical Society were abolitionists. Newcastle also became a glass producer with a reputation for brilliant flint glass.

A permanent military presence was established in the city with the completion of Fenham Barracks in 1806.

The great fire of Newcastle and Gateshead was a tragic and spectacular series of events starting on Friday 6 October 1854, in which a substantial amount of property in the two North East of England towns was destroyed in a series of fires and an explosion which killed 53 and injured hundreds.

The status of city was granted to Newcastle on 3 June 1882. In the 19th century, shipbuilding and heavy engineering were central to the city's prosperity; and the city was a powerhouse of the Industrial Revolution. This revolution resulted in the urbanisation of the city. In 1817 the Maling company, at one time the largest pottery company in the world, moved to the city. The Victorian industrial revolution brought industrial structures that included the  Victoria Tunnel, built in 1842, which provided underground wagon ways to the staithes. On 3 February 1879, Mosley Street in the city, was the first public road in the world to be lit up by the incandescent lightbulb. Newcastle was one of the first cities in the world to be lit up by electric lighting. Innovations in Newcastle and surrounding areas included the development of safety lamps, Stephenson's Rocket, Lord Armstrong's artillery, Be-Ro flour, Lucozade, Joseph Swan's electric light bulbs, and Charles Parsons' invention of the steam turbine, which led to the revolution of marine propulsion and the production of cheap electricity. In 1882, Newcastle became the seat of an Anglican diocese, with St. Nicholas' Church becoming its cathedral.

20th and 21st centuries
Newcastle's public transport system was modernised in 1901 when Newcastle Corporation Tramways electric trams were introduced to the city's streets, though these were replaced gradually by trolley buses from 1935, with the tram service finally coming to an end in 1950.

The city acquired its first art gallery, the Laing Art Gallery in 1904, so named after its founder Alexander Laing, a Scottish wine and spirit merchant who wanted to give something back to the city in which he had made his fortune. Another art gallery, the Hatton Gallery (now part of Newcastle University), opened in 1925.

With the advent of the motor car, Newcastle's road network was improved in the early part of the 20th century, beginning with the opening of the Redheugh road bridge in 1901 and the Tyne Bridge in 1928.

Efforts to preserve the city's historic past were evident as long ago as 1934, when the Museum of Science and Industry opened, as did the John G Joicey Museum in the same year.

Council housing began to replace inner-city slums in the 1920s, and the process continued into the 1970s, along with substantial private house building and acquisitions.

Unemployment hit record heights in Newcastle during the Great Depression of the 1930s.
The city's last coal pit closed in 1956, though a temporary open cast mine was opened in 2013  The temporary open cast mine shifted 40,000 tonnes of coal, using modern techniques to reduce noise, on a part of the City undergoing redevelopment. The slow demise of the shipyards on the banks of the River Tyne happened in the 1970s, 1980s, and 1990s.

During the Second World War, the city and surrounding area were a target for air raids as heavy industry was involved in the production of ships and armaments. The raids caused 141 deaths and 587 injuries. A former French consul in Newcastle called Jacques Serre assisted the German war effort by describing important targets in the region to Admiral Raeder who was the head of the German Navy.

The public sector in Newcastle began to expand in the 1960s. The federal structure of the University of Durham was dissolved. That university's college in Newcastle, which had been known as King's College, became the University of Newcastle upon Tyne (now known as Newcastle University), which was founded in 1963, followed by Newcastle Polytechnic in 1969; the latter received university status in 1992 and became the University of Northumbria at Newcastle (now known as Northumbria University).

Further efforts to preserve the city's historic past continued in the later 20th century, with the opening of Newcastle Military Vehicle Museum in 1983 and Stephenson Railway Museum in 1986. The Military Vehicle museum closed in 2006. New developments at the turn of the 21st century included the Life Science Centre in 2000 and Millennium Bridge in 2001.

Based at St James' Park since 1886, Newcastle United F.C. became Football League members in 1893. They have won four top division titles (the first in 1905 and the most recent in 1927), six FA Cups (the first in 1910 and the most recent in 1955) and the Inter-Cities Fairs Cup in 1969. They broke the world transfer record in 1996 by paying £15 million for Blackburn Rovers and England striker Alan Shearer, one of the most prolific goalscorers of that era.

In 2017, Newcastle was the venue for the 2017 Freedom City festival. The 2017 Freedom City festival commemorated the 50 years since Dr Martin Luther King's visit to Newcastle, where King received his honorary degree from Newcastle University. In 2018 Newcastle hosted the Great Exhibition of the North, the largest event in England in 2018. The exhibition began on 22 June with an opening ceremony on the River Tyne, and ended on 9 September with the Great North Run weekend. The exhibition describes the story of the north of England through its innovators, artists, designers and businesses.

In 2019, various travel sites named Newcastle to be the friendliest city in the UK.

Geography

Since 1974, Newcastle has been a part of the metropolitan county of Tyne and Wear in North East England.
 
The ground beneath the city is formed from Carboniferous strata of the Middle Pennine Coal Measures Group — a suite of sandstones, mudstones and coal seams which generally dip moderately eastwards. To the west of the city are the Upper Pennine Coal Measures and further west again the sandstones and mudstones of the Stainmore Formation, the local equivalent of the Millstone Grit.

In large parts, Newcastle still retains a medieval street layout. Narrow alleys or 'chares', most of which can only be traversed by foot, still exist in abundance, particularly around the riverside. Stairs from the riverside to higher parts of the city centre and the extant Castle Keep, originally recorded in the 14th century, remain intact in places. Close, Sandhill and Quayside contain modern buildings as well as structures dating from the 15th–18th centuries, including Bessie Surtees House, the Cooperage and Lloyds Quayside Bars, Derwentwater House and House of Tides, a restaurant situated at a Grade I-listed 16th century merchant's house at 28–30 Close.

The city has an extensive neoclassical centre referred to as Tyneside Classical, largely developed in the 1830s by Richard Grainger and John Dobson. More recently, Newcastle architecture considered to be Tyneside classical has been extensively restored. Broadcaster and writer Stuart Maconie described Newcastle as England's best-looking city and the German-born British scholar of architecture, Nikolaus Pevsner, describes Grey Street as one of the finest streets in England. In 1948 the poet John Betjeman said of Grey Street, “As for the curve of Grey Street, I shall never forget seeing it to perfection, traffic-less on a misty Sunday morning.” The street curves down from Grey's Monument towards the valley of the River Tyne and was voted England's finest street in 2005 in a survey of BBC Radio 4 listeners. In the Google Street View awards of 2010, Grey Street came 3rd in the British picturesque category. A portion of Grainger Town was demolished in the 1960s to make way for the Eldon Square Shopping Centre, including all but one side of the original Eldon Square itself.

Immediately to the north-west of the city centre is Leazes Park, first opened to the public in 1873 after a petition by 3,000 working men of the city for "ready access to some open ground for the purpose of health and recreation". Just outside one corner of this is St James' Park, the stadium home of Newcastle United FC which dominates the view of the city from all directions.

Another major green space in the city is the Town Moor, lying immediately north of the city centre. It is larger than London's Hyde Park and Hampstead Heath put together and the freemen of the city have the right to graze cattle on it. The right extends to the pitch of St. James' Park, Newcastle United Football Club's ground; this is not exercised, although the Freemen do collect rent for the loss of privilege. Honorary freemen include Bob Geldof, King Harald V of Norway, Bobby Robson, Alan Shearer, the late Nelson Mandela and the Royal Shakespeare Company. The Hoppings funfair, said to be the largest travelling funfair in Europe, is held here annually in June.

In the south-eastern corner of the Town Moor is Exhibition Park, which contains the only remaining pavilion from the North East Coast Exhibition of 1929. From the 1970s until 2006 this housed the Newcastle Military Vehicle Museum; which closed in 2006. The pavilion is now being used as a microbrewery and concert venue for Wylam Brewery.

 Ouseburn 
The wooded gorge of the Ouseburn in the east of the city is known as Jesmond Dene and forms another recreation area, linked by Armstrong Park and Heaton Park to the Ouseburn Valley, where the river finally reaches the River Tyne.

The springtime dawn chorus at 55 degrees latitude has been described as one of the best in the world. The dawn chorus of the Jesmond Dene green space has been professionally recorded and has been used in various workplace and hospital rehabilitation facilities.

Quayside

The area around the Tyne Gorge, between Newcastle on the north bank and Gateshead on the south bank, is the famous Newcastle-Gateshead Quayside. It is famed for its series of dramatic bridges, including the Tyne Bridge of 1928 which was built by Dorman Long of Middlesbrough, Robert Stephenson's High Level Bridge of 1849, the first road/rail bridge in the world, and the Swing Bridge of 1876.

Large-scale regeneration efforts have led to the replacement of former shipping premises with modern new office developments; an innovative tilting bridge - the Gateshead Millennium Bridge - integrated the Quayside more closely with the Gateshead Quayside, home to the BALTIC Centre for Contemporary Art (the venue for the Turner Prize 2011) and the Norman Foster-designed The Sage Gateshead music centre. The Newcastle and Gateshead Quaysides are now a thriving, cosmopolitan area with bars, restaurants, hotels and public spaces.

Grainger Town

The historic heart of Newcastle is the Grainger Town area. Established on classical streets built by Richard Grainger, a builder and developer, between 1835 and 1842, some of Newcastle upon Tyne's finest buildings and streets lie within this area of the city centre including Grainger Market, Theatre Royal, Grey Street, Grainger Street and Clayton Street. These buildings are predominantly four stories high, with vertical dormers, domes, turrets and spikes. Richard Grainger was said to 'have found Newcastle of bricks and timber and left it in stone'. Of Grainger Town's 450 buildings, 244 are listed, of which 29 are grade I and 49 are grade II*.

Grey's Monument, which commemorates Prime Minister Earl Grey and his Reform Act of 1832, stands above Monument Metro Station and was designed and built by Edward Hodges Baily and Benjamin Green. Hodges, who also built Nelson's Column, designed and built the statue, and the monument plinth was designed and built by Benjamin Green.

The Grainger Market replaced an earlier market originally built in 1808 called the Butcher Market. The Grainger Market itself, was opened in 1835 and was Newcastle's first indoor market. At the time of its opening in 1835 it was said to be one of the largest and most beautiful markets in Europe. The opening was celebrated with a grand dinner attended by 2000 guests, and the Laing Art Gallery has a painting of this event. With the exception of the timber roof which was destroyed by a fire in 1901 and replaced by latticed-steel arches the Market is largely in its original condition. The Grainger Market architecture, like most in Grainger Town, which are either grade I or II listed, was listed grade I in 1954 by English Heritage.

The development of the city in the 1960s saw the demolition of part of Grainger Town as a prelude to the modernist rebuilding initiatives of T. Dan Smith, the leader of Newcastle City Council. A corruption scandal was uncovered involving Smith and John Poulson, a property developer from Pontefract, West Yorkshire, and both were imprisoned. Echoes of the scandal were revisited in the late 1990s in the BBC TV mini-series, Our Friends in the North.

Chinatown

Newcastle's thriving Chinatown lies in the north-west of Grainger Town, centred on Stowell Street. A new Chinese arch, or paifang, providing a landmark entrance, was handed over to the city with a ceremony in 2005.

Housing
The Tyneside flat was the dominant housing form constructed at the time when the industrial centres on Tyneside were growing most rapidly. They can still be found in areas such as South Heaton in Newcastle but once dominated the streetscape on both sides of the Tyne. Tyneside flats were built as terraces, one of each pair of doors led to an upstairs flat while the other led into the ground-floor flat, each of two or three rooms. A new development in the Ouseburn valley has recreated them; Architects Cany Ash and Robert Sakula were attracted by the possibilities of high density without building high and getting rid of common areas.

In terms of housing stock, the authority is one of few authorities to see the proportion of detached homes rise in the 2010 Census (to 7.8%), in this instance this was coupled with a similar rise in flats and waterside apartments to 25.6%, and the proportion of converted or shared houses in 2011 renders this dwelling type within the highest of the five colour-coded brackets at 5.9%, and on a par with Oxford and Reading, greater than Manchester and Liverpool and below a handful of historic densely occupied, arguably overinflated markets in the local authorities: Harrogate, Cheltenham, Bath, inner London, Hastings, Brighton and Royal Tunbridge Wells.

Significant Newcastle housing developments include Ralph Erskine's the Byker Wall designed in the 1960s, and now Grade II* listed. It is on UNESCO's list of outstanding 20th-century buildings.

Climate
Newcastle has an oceanic climate (Köppen: Cfb). Data in Newcastle was first collected in 1802 by the solicitor James Losh. Situated in the rain shadow of the North Pennines, Newcastle is amongst the driest cities in the UK. Newcastle can have cool to cold winters, though usually warmer than the rural areas around it, and the winters are often compensated for by warm summers, with very long daylight hours in the summer months, longer than all other major English Cities. Newcastle upon Tyne shares the same latitude as Copenhagen, Denmark and southern Sweden.

Durham's inland, less urbanised setting results in night-time temperature data about 1 degree cooler than Newcastle proper throughout the year.

Environment

The city is located within the centre of the North East Green Belt, also known as the Tyne and Wear Green Belt.

The green belts stated aims are to:

 Prevent the merging of settlements Safeguard the countryside from encroachment Check unrestricted urban sprawl Assist in urban regeneration in the city-region by encouraging the recycling of derelict and other urban landThe green belt surrounds Brunswick Village, Dinnington, Callerton, Hazlerigg, Throckley, Walbottle, and Woolsington. Popular locations such as Ryton Island, Tyne Riverside Country Park, the city's golf courses, Newcastle Racecourse, and Newcastle International Airport fall inside the green belt.

The city has been recognised for its commitment to environmental issues, with a programme planned for Newcastle to become "the first carbon neutral city" however, those plans have been revised and they now hope to be carbon neutral by 2050.

Culture

NightlifeThe Rough Guide to Britain placed Newcastle upon Tyne's nightlife as Great Britain's no. 1 tourist attraction. In the Tripadvisor Travellers' Choice Destination Awards for Nightlife destinations, Newcastle was awarded third place in Europe (behind London and Berlin) and seventh place in the world.

There are many bars on the Bigg Market and its adjoining streets. Other areas popular for nightlife include Collingwood Street (commonly referred to as the 'Diamond Strip' due to its concentration of high-end bars). Neville Street, the Central Station area, Osborne Road in Jesmond and the wider Ouseburn area are home to a variety of younger metropolitan bars. “The Gate", located on Newgate Street, has become a popular venue for late-night entertainment in the past decade and a half. Newcastle's ‘pink triangle’ is concentrated on Times Square, surrounded by the Centre for Life.

Food
Bakery chain, Greggs, was founded and is headquartered in Newcastle and has the greatest number of Greggs stores per capita in the world. Local delicacies include pease pudding and stottie cake.

In 1967, London based Smith's Crisps created Salt & Vinegar flavour crisps which were first produced by their Newcastle based subsidiary Tudor Crisps and tested in Tudor's home market of north-east England before being launched nationally.

In 2010, Osborne Road in Jesmond was awarded fourth place in the UK Google Street View awards for the "foodie" category. Newcastle has its own Chinatown.

Additionally, the city has a wide variety of cuisines available including Greek, Mexican, Spanish, Indian, Italian, Persian, Japanese, Malaysian, French, American, Mongolian, Moroccan, Thai, Polish, Vietnamese and Lebanese. There has also been a noticeable growth in Newcastle's gourmet restaurant industry in recent years.

Theatre
The city has a proud history of theatre. Stephen Kemble of the well-known Kemble family managed the original Theatre Royal, Newcastle for fifteen years (1791–1806). He brought members of his famous acting family such as Sarah Siddons and John Kemble out of London to Newcastle. Stephen Kemble guided the theatre through many celebrated seasons. The original Theatre Royal in Newcastle was opened on 21 January 1788 and was located on Mosley Street. It was demolished to make way for Grey Street, where its replacement was built. 

The city still contains many theatres. The largest, the Theatre Royal on Grey Street, first opened in 1837, designed by John and Benjamin Green. It has hosted a season of performances from the Royal Shakespeare Company for over 25 years, as well as touring productions of West End musicals. The Mill Volvo Tyne Theatre hosts smaller touring productions, whilst other venues feature local talent. Northern Stage, formally known as the Newcastle Playhouse and Gulbenkian Studio, hosts various local, national and international productions in addition to those produced by the Northern Stage company. Other theatres in the city include the Live Theatre, the People's Theatre, Gosforth Civic Theatre, and the Jubilee Theatre. NewcastleGateshead was voted in 2006 as the arts capital of the UK in a survey conducted by the Artsworld TV channel.

Literature and libraries

Newcastle has a strong reputation as a poetry centre. The Morden Tower, run by poet Tom Pickard, is a major venue for poetry readings in the North East, being the place where Basil Bunting gave the first reading of Briggflatts in 1965.

The Literary and Philosophical Society of Newcastle upon Tyne (popularly known as the 'Lit & Phil') is the largest independent library outside London, housing more than 150,000 books. Its music library contains 8,000 CDs and 10,000 LPs. The current Lit and Phil premises were built in 1825 and the building was designed by John and Benjamin Green. Operating since 1793 and founded as a 'conversation club,' its lecture theatre was the first public building to be lit by electric light, during a lecture by Joseph Swan on 20 October 1880.

The old City library designed by Basil Spence, was demolished in 2006 and replaced. The new building opened on 21 June 2009 and was named after 18th century composer Charles Avison; the building was opened by Dr Herbert Loebl.

Seven Stories, the National Centre for Children's Books, opened in 2005 in the Ouseburn Valley.

Festivals and fairs
In either January or February, Newcastle's Chinatown becomes the focus point of celebrations for the Chinese New Year with carnivals and parades.

The Newcastle Science Festival, now called Newcastle ScienceFest, returns annually in early March.

The Newcastle Beer Festival, organised by CAMRA takes place in April each year. Evolution Festival, a music festival that attracted tens of thousands of attendees, took place in May from 2002 until 2013 and was described as "the biggest festival Tyneside has ever staged". The This Is Tomorrow festival now takes place over the spring bank holiday and is in the same location. The biennial AV Festival of international electronic art, featuring exhibitions, concerts, conferences and film screenings, is held in March. The North East Art Expo, a festival of art and design from the regions professional artists, is held in late May.

The Hoppings, the largest annual collection of travelling fairs in Europe, comes together on Newcastle Town Moor every June. The event has its origins in the Temperance Movement during the early 1880s, and coincides with the annual race week at High Gosforth Park. Newcastle Community Green Festival, which claims to be the UK's biggest free community environmental festival, also takes place every June, in Leazes Park. The Cyclone Festival of Cycling takes place within, or starting from, Newcastle in June. The Northern Pride Festival and Parade is held in Leazes Park and in the city's Gay Community in mid July. The Ouseburn Festival, a family oriented weekend festival near the city centre, incorporating a "Family Fun Day" and "Carnival Day", is held in late July.

Newcastle Mela, held on the late August Bank Holiday weekend, is an annual two-day multicultural event that blends drama, music and food from Punjabi, Pakistani, Bengali and Hindu cultures. NewcastleGateshead also holds an annual International Arts Fair. The 2009 event will be in the Norman Foster designed Sage Gateshead Music and Arts Centre in September. In October, there is the Design Event festival—an annual festival providing the public with an opportunity to see work by regional, national and international designers.
The SAMA Festival, an East Asian cultural festival is also held in early October.

Music

Newcastle's vernacular music was a mixture of Northumbrian folk music and nineteenth-century songs with dialect lyrics, by writers such as George "Geordie" Ridley, whose songs include one which became an unofficial Tyneside national anthem, "Blaydon Races".

The 1960s saw the internationally successful rock group The Animals emerge from Newcastle night spots such as Club A-Go-Go on Percy Street. Other well-known acts with connections to the city include Sting, Bryan Ferry, Dire Straits and more recently Maxïmo Park. There is also a thriving underground music scene that encompasses a variety of styles, including drum and bass, doom metal and post-rock.

Lindisfarne are a folk-rock group with a strong Tyneside connection. Their most famous song, "Fog on the Tyne" (1971), was covered by Geordie ex-footballer Paul Gascoigne in 1990. Venom, reckoned by many to be the originators of black metal and extremely influential to the extreme metal scene as a whole, formed in Newcastle in 1979. Folk metal band Skyclad, often regarded as the first folk metal band, also formed in Newcastle after the break-up of Martin Walkyier thrash metal band, Sabbat. Andy Taylor, former lead guitarist of Duran Duran was born here in 1961. Brian Johnson was a member of local rock band Geordie before becoming the lead vocalist for Australian band AC/DC.

Newcastle is the home of Kitchenware Records (c. 1982), previously home to acclaimed bands such as Prefab Sprout, Martin Stephenson and the Daintees and The Fatima Mansions. The members of Lighthouse Family met at Newcastle University; the music video for their hit single "High" features the city's Tyne Bridge.

The 1990s boom in progressive house music saw the city's Global Underground record label publish mix CDs by the likes of Sasha, Paul Oakenfold, James Lavelle, and Danny Howells recording mix compilations. The label is still going strong today with offices in London and New York, and new releases from Deep Dish and Adam Freeland.

Newcastle's leading classical music ensemble is the Royal Northern Sinfonia, which was founded in 1958 and performed regularly at Newcastle City Hall until 2004. Nowadays it is based at The Sage, Gateshead.

ICMuS, Newcastle University's music department, has been a driving force for music in the region, producing innovative work, organising concerts and festivals, instigating the first degree programme in folk music in the British Isles, and engaging creatively with communities in the region.

Concert venues

The largest venue used for music concerts is St James Park, home of Newcastle United, which has also previously been used for Rugby League games and the Olympic Games. The second largest music venue in Newcastle is the 11,000-seat Utilita Arena Newcastle, which opened in 1995 and hosts major pop and rock concerts. Newcastle City Hall is one of the oldest venues in the region and "attracts big names who are often legends of the past". Both of the city's universities have venues that mainly host indie and alternative bands.

On 14 October 2005, the 2,000 capacity O2 Academy Newcastle opened. It had previously been a music venue in the 1960s, hosting concerts by The Beatles and The Who. The new venue was headlined by The Futureheads on the opening night and known as the Carling Academy for a number of years. Since opening the venue has hosted performances by major bands and solo musicians including Adele, Arctic Monkeys, Katy Perry, The Libertines, Blondie and Amy Winehouse.

The Riverside music venue on Melbourne Street, open from 1985 until 1999, notably hosted Nirvana's first European show in 1989. The venue also welcomed Oasis, David Bowie and The Stone Roses and was named Best Regional Venue by NME in 1993. Riverside has also been the subject of a book, Riverside: Newcastle's Legendary Alternative Music Venue.

In 2016 open-air concerts took place at Times Square for the first time, including performances from Maxïmo Park, Ocean Colour Scene and Catfish and the Bottlemen.

The small music venue Think Tank? was a nominee for Best Small Venue in NME in 2015. The Cluny in Ouseburn Valley is "one of the most important venues for breaking bands in the region". Trillians Rock Bar is well-noted for its rock and metal shows, and The Head of Steam is a 90-capacity basement venue described as "one of Newcastle's staple venues".

Independent cinema

Newcastle has multiple independent cinemas, including the famous Tyneside Cinema, located on Pilgrim Street. It originally opened as the 'Bijou News-Reel Cinema' in 1937, and was designed and built by Dixon Scott, great-uncle of film directors Ridley Scott and Tony Scott. The Pilgrim Street building was refurbished between November 2006 and May 2008; during the refurbishment works, the cinema relocated to the Old Town Hall, Gateshead. In May 2008 the Tyneside Cinema reopened in the restored and refurbished original building. The site currently houses three cinemas, including the restored Classic —the United Kingdom's last surviving news cinema still in full-time operation—alongside two new screens, and dedicated education and teaching suites.

As well as this, the city is home to The Side Cinema and Star and Shadow Cinema which are both small venues which have built up cult audiences of film fans.

Museums and galleries
There are several museums and galleries in Newcastle, including the Centre for Life with its Science Village; the Discovery Museum a museum highlighting life on Tyneside, including Tyneside's shipbuilding heritage, and inventions which changed the world; the Great North Museum; in 2009 the Newcastle on Tyne Museum of Antiquities merged with the Great North Museum (Hancock Museum); Seven Stories, the National Centre for Children's Books; the Side Gallery with historical and contemporary photography from around the world and Northern England; and the Newburn Motor Museum.

The Laing Art Gallery, similarly to other art galleries and museums around the world, has collections digitised on the Google Cultural Institute, an initiative that makes important cultural material accessible online.

Media

TV and film

The earliest known film featuring some exterior scenes filmed in the city is On the Night of the Fire (1939), though by and large the action is studio-bound. Later came The Clouded Yellow (1951) and Payroll (1961), both of which feature more extensive scenes filmed in the city. The gangster thriller Get Carter (1971) was shot on location in and around Newcastle and offers an opportunity to see what Newcastle looked like in the early 1970s. The city was also backdrop to another gangster film, the film noir Stormy Monday (1988), directed by Mike Figgis and starring Tommy Lee Jones, Melanie Griffith, Sting and Sean Bean. As well as this, Newcastle was used as the location for I, Daniel Blake (2016) which won the Palme d'Or award at Cannes Film Festival as well as the BAFTA for Outstanding British Film.

The city has been the setting for films based around football; films such as Purely Belter (2000), The One and Only (2002) and Goal! have all been focused around Tyneside. The comedy School for Seduction (2004), starring Kelly Brook was also filmed in Newcastle.

The Bollywood film Hum Tum Aur Ghost (2010) was shot on location in Newcastle's city centre and features key scenes in and around Grainger Town. The film Public Sex (2009) was shot in and around Newcastle, and features several scenes under and around the Tyne Bridge.

Crime drama Harrigan (2013) was filmed in the city as well as Gateshead and Teesside.

Print media

Local newspapers that are printed in Newcastle include Trinity Mirror's Evening Chronicle and The Journal, the Sunday Sun as well as the Metro freesheet. The Crack is a monthly style and listings magazine similar to London's Time Out. The adult comic Viz originated in Jesmond and includes many references to Newcastle, and The Mag is a fanzine for Newcastle United supporters.

Television
BBC North East and Cumbria is based to the north of the city on Barrack Road, Spital Tongues, in a building known as the Pink Palace. It is from here that the Corporation broadcasts the Look North television regional news programme and local radio station BBC Radio Newcastle.

ITV Tyne Tees was based at City Road for over 40 years after its launch in January 1959. In 2005 it moved to a new facility on The Watermark business park next to the MetroCentre in Gateshead. The entrance to studio 5 at the City Road complex gave its name to the 1980s music television programme, The Tube.

Radio
Independent Local Radio stations include Metro Radio and sister station Greatest Hits Radio North East, which are both based on the north side of the Tyne Bridge. Capital North East broadcasts across Newcastle and the North East England region from its studios in Wallsend. Heart North East and Smooth North East also broadcast from studios in the city.

NE1fm launched on 8 June 2007, the first full-time community radio station in the area.

Newcastle Student Radio is run by students from both of the city's universities, broadcasting from Newcastle University's students' union building during term time. Radio Tyneside has been the voluntary hospital radio service for most hospitals across Newcastle and Gateshead since 1951, broadcasting on Hospedia
 online, and also on 93.6 FM since July 2018 also under a community radio licence.
The city also has a Radio Lollipop station based at the Great North Children's Hospital in the Newcastle Royal Victoria Infirmary.

Public City WiFi

Newcastle was one of the first cities in the UK to have its city centre covered by free wireless internet access. It was developed and installed at the end of 2006 and went active in March 2007.

Economy

Newcastle played a major role during the 19th-century Industrial Revolution, and was a leading centre for coal mining, shipbuilding, engineering, munitions and manufacturing. Heavy industries in Newcastle declined in the second half of the 20th century; with office, service and retail employment now becoming the city's staples.

Newcastle is the commercial, educational and the cultural hub of North East England. Today, Newcastle's economy contributes around £13 billion to the UK GVA. This figure is mostly produced by corporate activity in Newcastle's Central Business District, located in the centre of the city (bounded by the Haymarket, Central Station and the Quayside areas).

The city's thriving nightlife is estimated to be worth £340 million per year, and consequently is seen as a major contributor to Newcastle's economy.

The UK's first biotechnology village, the Centre for Life, is located by Central Station. The village is the first step in the City Council's plans to transform Newcastle into a science city.

Retail
thumb|
Old Eldon Square, the Eldon Square Shopping Centre is built around it and takes its name from it.
In 2010, Newcastle was positioned ninth in the retail centre expenditure league of the UK. There are several major shopping areas in Newcastle City Centre. The largest of these is the Eldon Square Shopping Centre, one of the largest city centre shopping complexes in the UK. It has one of the largest John Lewis & Partners stores in the UK. This John Lewis branch was formerly known as Bainbridge, established in 1838, often cited as the world's first department store. Emerson Bainbridge (1817–1892), a pioneer and the founder of Bainbridge, sold goods via department, a new arrangement of trade for that time. The Bainbridge official ledgers reported revenue by department, giving birth to the name department store. Eldon Square is currently undergoing a full redevelopment. A new bus station, replacing the old underground bus station, was officially opened in March 2007. The wing of the centre, including the undercover Green Market, near Grainger Street was demolished in 2007 so that the area could be redeveloped. This was completed in February 2010 with the opening of a Debenhams department store as well as other major stores including Apple, Hollister and Guess.

The main shopping street in the city is Northumberland Street. In a 2004 report, it was ranked as the most expensive shopping street in the UK for rent, outside London. It is home to two major department stores including the first and largest Fenwick department store, which houses some of the most luxurious designer labels, and one of the largest Marks and Spencer stores outside London. Both stores have entrances into Eldon Square Shopping Centre.

Other shopping destinations in Newcastle include Grainger Street and the area around Grey's Monument, the relatively modern Eldon Garden and Monument Mall complexes, Central Arcade and the traditional Grainger Market. On Blackett Street can be found the silversmith Reid & Sons which was established in the city in 1788. Outside the city centre, the largest suburban shopping areas are Gosforth and Byker. The largest Tesco store in the United Kingdom is located in Kingston Park on the edge of Newcastle.
Close to Newcastle, the largest indoor shopping centre in Europe, the MetroCentre, is located in Gateshead.

Population

According to the ONS, Newcastle had a population of 293,000 in 2015. Tyneside (made up of Newcastle and the surrounding metropolitan boroughs of Gateshead, North Tyneside and South Tyneside) has a population of approximately 880,000, making it the eighth most populous urban area in the UK. The wider metropolitan area of Tyneside-Wearside has a population of approximately 1,122,000.

Additionally, Newcastle is home to a large temporary population of students from Newcastle and Northumbria universities. Areas of suburban Newcastle with significant student populations include Jesmond, Shieldfield, Gosforth, Sandyford, Spital Tongues and Heaton.

Demographics
Age
According to the same statistics, the average age of people living in Newcastle is 37.8 years, compared to the national average being of 38.6 years.

Religion
From the 2011 Census, two significant religions could be identified in the city: Christian and Muslim. 56.6% of Newcastle identified as Christian and 6.3% as Muslim. Over 28% stated they have no religious affiliation.

Ethnicity and nationality
According to the 2011 census, the metropolitan borough of Newcastle upon Tyne was predominately white, representing 85.3% of the population (including non-British white). Asians made up 9.8% of the population (2.3% Pakistani, 1.7% 'Bangladeshi', 1.8% 'Indian', 2.2% 'Chinese', 1.8% 'Asian other'). Black people make up a small proportion of the population (1.7% 'Black African', 0.1% 'Black Caribbean' and 0.1% 'Black other'), as do mixed race groups at 1.6% (0.6% 'Asian and White', 0.3% 'White and Caribbean', 0.3% 'White and African', 0.4% 'White and Other'). The last significantly sized ethnic community in Newcastle is 'Arab' at 0.9%. The remainder of the population, 0.5%, represent other ethnicities.

Large populations of ethnic minorities can be found in areas such as Elswick, Wingrove and Arthurs Hill.

According to the 2011 UK Census, those born outside the UK were mainly from India (3,315), China (3,272), Pakistan (2,644), Bangladesh (2,276), Poland (1,473), Germany (1,357), Nigeria (1,226), Iran (1,164), Hong Kong (1,038) and Ireland (942).
In the North East, Newcastle was the most ethnically diverse district followed by Middlesbrough.

There are also small but significant Chinese, Jewish and Eastern European populations. The International Organization for Migration states there are estimated to be between 500 and 2,000 Bolivians in Newcastle, one of the largest populations in any city in the UK.

Geordies

The regional nickname for people from Newcastle and the surrounding area is Geordie. The Latin term Novocastrian can equally be applied to residents of any place called Newcastle, although it is most commonly used for ex-pupils of the city's Royal Grammar School.

Dialect

The dialect of Newcastle is also referred to as Geordie. It contains a large amount of vocabulary and distinctive words and pronunciations not used in other parts of the United Kingdom. The Geordie dialect has much of its origins in the language spoken by the Anglo-Saxon populations who migrated to and conquered much of England after the end of Roman Imperial rule. This language was the forerunner of Modern English; but while the dialects of other English regions have been heavily altered by the influences of other foreign languages—particularly Latin and Norman French—the Geordie dialect retains many elements of the old language. An example of this is the pronunciation of certain words: "dead", "cow", "house" and "strong" are pronounced "deed", "coo", "hoos" and "strang"—which is how they were pronounced in the Anglo-Saxon language. Other Geordie words with Anglo-Saxon origins include: "larn" (from the Anglo-Saxon "laeran", meaning "teach"), "burn" ("stream") and "gan" ("go").

According to the British Library, "Locals insist there are significant differences between Geordie and several other local dialects, such as Pitmatic and Mackem. Pitmatic is the dialect of the former mining areas in County Durham and around Ashington to the north of Newcastle upon Tyne, while Mackem is used locally to refer to the dialect of the city of Sunderland and the surrounding urban area of Wearside".

"Bairn" and "hyem", meaning "child" and "home", respectively, are examples of Geordie words with origins in Scandinavia; barn and hjem are the corresponding modern Norwegian and Danish words. Some words used in the Geordie dialect are used elsewhere in the Northern United Kingdom. The words "bonny" (meaning "pretty") and "stot" ("bounce") are used in Scots;   "aye" ("yes") and "nowt" (IPA:/naʊt/, rhymes with out, "nothing") are used elsewhere in Northern England. Many words, however, appear to be used exclusively in Newcastle and the surrounding area, such as "canny" (a versatile word meaning "good", "nice" or "very"), "hacky" ("dirty"), "netty" ("toilet"), "hockle" ("spit").

Health

According to research from 2011, public health and levels of deprivation in Newcastle upon Tyne was generally worse than average in England. As levels of deprivation is considerably higher than the nationwide average, sociologists argue that as a result, the life expectancy for both men and women is lower than the nationwide average. There is significant discrepancy between life expectancies in wealthy areas and deprived areas, with life expectancy up to 14.3 years lower for men and 11.1 years lower for women in deprived areas than in wealthy areas. From 2015 to 2019 Newcastle became relatively more deprived according to the Index of Multiple Deprivation.

From 2001 to 2011, as with all UK cities all-cause mortality rates have fallen, life expectancy has increased. Early death rates from cancer and from heart disease and stroke have fallen but remain worse than the England average.

Almost 21.9% of Year 6 children are clinically obese. In 2014/5, 35.9% of 10 to 11-year-olds were classified as overweight or obese, in comparison to a national average of 33.2%. 54.9% of pupils meet the recommendation of at least three hours each week on school sport. Levels of teenage pregnancy are higher than the nationwide average. In 2011, GCSE attainment amongst school children was worse than the England average. Estimated numbers of adults 'healthy eating' are lower than the England average. Rates of smoking-related deaths and hospital stays for alcohol-related harm are higher than average.

Newcastle remains one of the few major cities in England to supply fluoridated water; this scheme is directed by Northumbria Water plc.

Newcastle has two large teaching hospitals: the Royal Victoria Infirmary and the Freeman Hospital, which is also a pioneering centre for transplant surgery.

In a report, published in early February 2007 by the Ear Institute at the University College London and Widex, Newcastle was named as the noisiest city in the whole of the UK with an average noise level of 80.4 decibels. The report claimed that these noise levels would have a negative long-term impact on the health of the city's residents. The report was criticised, however, for attaching too much weight to readings at arbitrarily selected locations, which in Newcastle's case included a motorway underpass without pedestrian access. As well as numerous parks, open spaces, and extensive riverside areas, puzzlingly the report also overlooked the 1000-acre Town Moor at the heart of the city. Larger than London's Hyde Park and Hampstead Heath combined, and even larger than New York's Central Park, the town moor dates back to the 12th century, with the land tenure and its use being regulated by an Act of Parliament.

Sport

The city has a strong sporting tradition. Football club Newcastle United has been based at St James' Park since the club was established in 1892, although any traces of the original structure are now long gone as the stadium now holds more than 52,000 seated spectators, being England's seventh largest football stadium. The city also has non-League football clubs, Newcastle Benfield, West Allotment Celtic, Team Northumbria and Heaton Stannington.

There is a women's football team, Newcastle United Women's Football Club, founded in 1989. Newcastle United W.F.C. currently has 40 ladies aged between 16 and 29 years signed or associated with the club, and plays in the FA Women's Premier League (North).

The Newcastle Falcons are the only rugby union team in north-east England to have played in the Aviva Premiership. They play at Kingston Park Stadium in the northern suburb of Kingston Park. 1996 Pilkington Shield winners Medicals RFC are also based in Newcastle.

Newcastle Thunder (formerly Gateshead Thunder) are a professional rugby league club based in the city who now also play at Kingston Park Stadium. They currently play in the Kingstone Press League 1. Since 2015, the Super League Magic Weekend has been played annually in the city at St James' Park.

Newcastle has a horse racing course at Gosforth Park.
The city is also home to the Newcastle Eagles basketball team who play their home games at the new Sport Central complex at Northumbria University. The Eagles are the most successful team in the history of the British Basketball League (BBL).
The city's speedway team Newcastle Diamonds are based at Brough Park in Byker, a venue that is also home to greyhound racing. Another athletic event is the  Blaydon Race (a road race from Newcastle to Blaydon), which has taken place on 9 June annually since 1981, to commemorate the celebrated Blaydon Races horse racing.

The 2012 London Olympic committee selected Newcastle as one of the UK host venue cities, with the stadium St James' Park hosting 9 matches in both the men's and women's football.

The Newcastle Warriors were a professional ice hockey team that played the 1995–96 season in the British Hockey League. The Newcastle Vipers were also a professional ice hockey team in the British National League from 2002 and then the Elite Ice Hockey League between 2005 and 2011 (when the team folded).

Newcastle upon Tyne was one of the 11 host cities for the 2015 Rugby World Cup. St James' Park hosted three matches;
 South Africa v. Scotland (3 October 2015)
 New Zealand v. Tonga (9 October 2015)
 Samoa v. Scotland (10 October 2015)

Transport
Air

Newcastle International Airport is situated on the northern outskirts of the city at Woolsington, near to Ponteland. It is the largest and busiest airport in North East England and the second largest and busiest in Northern England (behind Manchester), handling over five million passengers per year. It is also the tenth-largest, and the fastest growing regional airport in the UK, expecting to reach 10 million passengers by 2016, and 15 million by 2030. , Newcastle Airport operates flights to 90 destinations worldwide.
The airport is serviced by numerous airlines including British Airways, Jet2, easyJet, Emirates, Ryanair, Air France, TUI Airways, Loganair, KLM and Eurowings.

The airport is connected to Central Newcastle by the Tyne and Wear Metro, with an average journey between Central Station Metro station and Newcastle Airport Metro station taking approximately 20 minutes.

Rail

Newcastle Central Station is a principal stop on the East Coast Main Line and Cross Country Route. It is one of the busiest stations in Britain.

Train operator London North Eastern Railway provides a half-hourly frequency of trains to London King's Cross, with a variable journey time of between two and three hours, and north to Scotland with all trains calling at Edinburgh Waverley and a small number of trains extended to Glasgow Central, Aberdeen and Inverness. CrossCountry links Newcastle with destinations in Yorkshire, the Midlands and the South West. TransPennine Express operates services to the North West. Northern Trains provide local and regional services. Additionally, ScotRail offer an infrequent service to Glasgow Central.

In 2014, work was completed on the station's historic entrance. Glazing was placed over the historic arches and the Victorian architecture was enhanced; transforming the 19th century public portico. The station is one of only six Grade One listed railway stations in the UK. Opened in 1850 by Queen Victoria, it was the first covered railway station in the world and was much copied across the UK. It has a neoclassical façade, originally designed by the architect John Dobson, and was constructed in collaboration with Robert Stephenson. The station sightlines towards the Castle Keep, whilst showcasing the curvature of the station's arched roof. The first services were operated by the North Eastern Railway company.

The other mainline station in Newcastle is Manors, exclusively served by Northern Trains.

Metro

The city is served by the Tyne and Wear Metro, a system of suburban and underground railways covering much of Newcastle and the surrounding metropolitan boroughs. It was opened in five phases between 1980 and 1984, and was Britain's first urban light rail transit system. The network was developed from a combination of existing and newly built tracks and stations, with deep-level tunnels constructed through Central Newcastle. A bridge was built across the Tyne, between Newcastle and Gateshead, and opened by Queen Elizabeth II in 1981. Extensions to the network were opened in 1991 and 2002. It is operated directly by Nexus, carrying over 37 million passengers a year. In 2004, the company Marconi designed and constructed the mobile radio system to the underground Metro system. The Metro system was the first in the UK to have mobile phone antennae installed in the tunnels.

The Metro consists of two lines. The Green line begins at Newcastle Airport, goes through Central Newcastle and into the City of Sunderland, terminating at South Hylton. The yellow line starts at St James, runs north of the river alongside Byker towards Whitley Bay, before returning to Central Newcastle, then connecting to Gateshead Interchange before finally terminating at South Shields.

The system is currently undergoing a period of refurbishment and modernisation, entitled 'Metro: All Change.' The programme has replaced all ticket machines and introduced ticket gates at the busiest stations – part of the transition to smart ticketing. All Metro trains are being completely refurbished and most stations are undergoing improvement works (or in some cases complete reconstruction, for example North Shields). In addition; tracks, signalling and overhead wires are also being overhauled. Longer-term plans include the procurement of an entirely new fleet of trains and further extensions to the system. Proposed routes include to Newcastle's west end, to the Cobalt Business Park in North Tyneside, to the Metrocentre in Gateshead and to additional locations in Gateshead, South Tyneside and Sunderland. Several of the proposed routes would require trams as opposed to the current light rail trains.

Road

Major roads in the area include the A1 (Newcastle Gateshead Western Bypass), stretching north to Edinburgh and south to London; the A19 heading south past Sunderland and Middlesbrough to York and Doncaster; the A69 heading west to Carlisle; the A696, which becomes the A68 heads past Newcastle Airport and up through central Northumberland and central Scottish Borders, the A167, the old "Great North Road", heading south to Gateshead, Chester-le-Street, Durham and Darlington; and the A1058 "Coast Road", which runs from Jesmond to the east coast between Tynemouth and Cullercoats. Many of these designations are recent—upon completion of the Western Bypass, and its designation as the new line of the A1, the roads between this and the A1's former alignment through the Tyne Tunnel were renumbered, with many city centre roads changing from a 6-prefix to their present 1-prefix numbers. In November 2011 the capacity of the Tyne Tunnel was increased when a project to build a second road tunnel and refurbish the first tunnel was completed.

Bus

Bus services in Newcastle upon Tyne and the surrounding boroughs part are coordinated by the Tyne and Wear Passenger Transport Executive. Stagecoach North East is the primary bus operator in the city, running city services between both the West and East ends, with some services extending out to the MetroCentre, Killingworth, Wallsend and Ponteland. Go North East provides the majority of services to and from the south of the Tyne, linking Newcastle with Gateshead, South Tyneside, Sunderland, and County Durham. Arriva North East runs numerous services to the north of city, North Tyneside and Northumberland. Additionally, QuayLink connects Newcastle and Gateshead to the Quayside. Newcastle Central coach station is the city's main hub for long-distance services, such as those operated by National Express.

Other major bus departure points are Pilgrim Street (for buses running south of the Tyne via Gateshead), and Blackett Street/Monument for services to the East and West of the city. Many bus services also pass Newcastle Central Station, a major interchange for rail and metro services.

Cycling
Newcastle is accessible by several mostly traffic-free cycle routes that lead to the edges of the city centre, where cyclists can continue into the city by road, using no car lanes. The traffic-free C2C cycle route runs along the north bank of the River Tyne, enabling cyclists to travel off-road to North Shields and Tynemouth in the east, and westwards towards Hexham.

Suburban cycle routes exist, which use converted trackbeds of former industrial wagonways and industrial railways. A network on Tyneside's suburban Victorian waggonways is being developed. A network of signed on-road cycle routes is being established, including some designated on-road cycle lanes that will lead from the city centre to the suburbs of Gosforth, Heaton and Wallsend.

Newcastle has a growing culture of bicycle usage. Newcastle is also home to a cycling campaign, called the 'Newcastle Cycling Campaign.' The ideal of the organisation is to model other European cities like Amsterdam and Copenhagen. The aims of the organisation, within the constitution are: To raise the profile of cycling, especially utility cycling around the city; to educate decision makers over the benefits of cycling; to promote equality.

Following guidelines set in the National Cycling strategy, Newcastle first developed its cycling strategy in 1998. , the city council's social aims and objectives for cycling include: highlighting the usage of cycling to cut city congestion and educating that cycling promotes healthy living The authority also has infrastructure aims and objectives which include: developing on road cycle networks on quieter streets; making safer routes on busier streets; innovating and implementing contraflows on one way streets; developing the existing off-road cycle route networks and improve signage; joining up routes that are partially or completely isolated; Increase the number of cycle parking facilities; working with employers to integrate cycling into workplace travel plans; link the local networks to national networks.

Water
DFDS Seaways runs a ferry service to IJmuiden, near Amsterdam in The Netherlands, from Newcastle International Ferry Terminal (located in North Shields). The DFDS ferry service to Gothenburg, Sweden, ceased at the end of October 2006 and their service to Bergen and Stavanger, Norway was terminated in late 2008. The company cited high fuel prices and new competition from low-cost air services as the cause. However, since summer 2007, Thomson cruise lines have included Newcastle as a departure port on its Norwegian and Fjords cruise.

Government and politics
UK Parliament
Newcastle is represented by three elected Members of Parliament (MPs) in the House of Commons, the lower house of the Parliament of the United Kingdom. All the current MPs are from the Labour Party, which is on the centre-left of the British political spectrum. The constituencies of Newcastle Central, Newcastle East, and Newcastle North are all considered to be Labour safe seats. 

Local government

Newcastle is locally governed by Newcastle City Council, a member of the North of Tyne Combined Authority. The council operates using the leader and cabinet system. The Labour Party has the most seats and therefore controls the council, with a large majority of fifty councillors. In opposition, there are twenty Liberal Democrats councillors, one Newcastle Independents councillor and three independent councillors. No other parties have any councillors, including the Conservatives.

For the purposes of City Council elections, Newcastle is divided into 26 electoral wards. Each ward elects three councillors. Following the boundary changes in 2016, the wards are as follows:

 Arthur's Hill
 Benwell and Scotswood
 Blakelaw
 Byker
 Callerton and Throckley
 Castle
 Chapel
 Dene and South Gosforth
 Denton and Westerhope
 Elswick
 Fawdon and West Gosforth
 Gosforth
 Heaton
 Kenton
 Kingston Park South and Newbiggin Hall
 Lemington
 Manor Park
 Monument
 North Jesmond
 Ouseburn
 Parklands
 South Jesmond
 Walker
 Walkergate
 West Fenham
 Wingrove

EU referendum
In the 2016 United Kingdom European Union membership referendum, Newcastle voted for the United Kingdom to remain in the European Union, with a ratio of 51:49 in favour of remain, compared to a national ratio of 48:52 in favour of leave.

Education
Schools and colleges

Newcastle has 74 primary schools and 20 secondary schools, of which 13 are LEA-funded and 7 are fee-paying independent schools.

There are a number of critically acclaimed state secondary schools, including Walker Riverside Academy, Gosforth Academy, Jesmond Park Academy, St Cuthbert's High School, St Mary's Catholic School, Kenton School, Sacred Heart, Excelsior Academy, Walbottle Academy and Benfield School.

The largest co-educational independent school is the Royal Grammar School. The largest girls' independent school is Newcastle High School for Girls. Both schools are located on the same street in Jesmond. Newcastle School for Boys is the only independent boys' only school in the city and is situated in Gosforth. Other independent schools include Dame Allan's School.

Newcastle College is the largest general further education (FE) college in North East England and is a Beacon Status college. There are also two smaller FE colleges in Newcastle.

Universities
The city has two major universities – Newcastle University and Northumbria University.

Newcastle University has its origins in the Durham University School of Medicine and Surgery, established in 1834.
It became fully independent on 1 August 1963, forming the University of Newcastle upon Tyne (now simply Newcastle University). It is a red brick university and is a member of the Russell Group, an association of research-intensive UK universities, often considered to represent the best UK universities. It won the Sunday Times University of the Year award in 2000. It was awarded the Gold Award in the Teaching Excellence Framework (TEF), one of only ten Russell Group universities to achieve the Gold TEF rating.

Northumbria University has its origins in Newcastle Polytechnic, established in 1969 and becoming the University of Northumbria at Newcastle in 1992 as part of the UK-wide process in which polytechnics became new universities. Northumbria University was voted 'Best New University' by The Times Good University Guide 2005. It holds the Silver TEF Award.

Religious sites

Newcastle has three cathedrals, the Anglican St Nicholas‘, with its elegant lantern tower of 1474, the Roman Catholic St Mary's designed by Augustus Welby Pugin and the Coptic Orthodox Cathedral in Fenham. All three cathedrals began their lives as parish churches. St Mary's became a cathedral in 1850 and St Nicholas' in 1882. Another prominent church in the city centre is the Church of St Thomas the Martyr which is the only parish church in the Church of England without a parish and which is not a peculiar.

One of the largest evangelical Anglican churches in the UK is Jesmond Parish Church, situated a little to the north of the city centre.

Newcastle is home to the only Baháʼí Centre in North East England; the centre has served the local Baháʼí community for over 25 years and is located close to the Civic Centre in Jesmond.

Newcastle was a prominent centre of the Plymouth Brethren movement up to the 1950s, and some small congregations still function. Among these are at the Hall, Denmark Street and Gospel Hall, St Lawrence.

The Parish Church of St Andrew is traditionally recognised as 'the oldest church in this town'. The present building was begun in the 12th Century and the last addition to it, apart from the vestries, was the main porch in 1726. It is quite possible that there was an earlier church here dating from Saxon times. This older church would have been one of several churches along the River Tyne dedicated to St Andrew, including the Priory church at Hexham. The building contains more old stonework than any other church in Newcastle. It is surrounded by the last of the ancient churchyards to retain its original character. Many key names associated with Newcastle's history worshipped and were buried here. The church tower received a battering during the Siege of Newcastle by the Scots who finally breached the Town Wall and forced surrender. Three of the cannonballs remain on site as testament to the siege.

Notable people

Charles Avison, the leading British composer of concertos in the 18th century, was born in Newcastle upon Tyne in 1709 and died there in 1770. Basil Hume, Archbishop of Westminster, was born in the city in 1923. Vice Admiral Cuthbert Collingwood, 1st Baron Collingwood, was born in the city. Ironmaster, metallurgist, and member of parliament Isaac Lowthian Bell was born in the city in 1816. Other notable people born in or associated with Newcastle include: engineer and industrialist Lord Armstrong, engineer and father of the modern steam railways George Stephenson, his son, also an engineer, Robert Stephenson, engineer and inventor of the steam turbine Sir Charles Parsons, inventor of the incandescent light bulb Sir Joseph Swan, actor and comedian Rowan Atkinson, industrial designer Sir Jonathan Ive, who studied at Newcastle Polytechnic (now Northumbria University), modernist poet Basil Bunting, and Lord Chief Justice Peter Taylor. Portuguese writer Eça de Queiroz was a diplomat in Newcastle from late 1874 until April 1879—his most productive literary period. Former Prime Minister of Thailand Abhisit Vejjajiva, was born in the city. Composer Agustín Fernández has been based in the city since 1995, teaching at Newcastle University and occasionally collaborating with Royal Northern Sinfonia.

Musicians Cheryl, Eric Burdon, Sting, Mark Knopfler, the Lighthouse Family, Jeffrey Dunn, Brian Johnson, Alan Hull, Sakima, and Neil Tennant lived in Newcastle. Hank Marvin and Bruce Welch were both former pupils of Rutherford Grammar School. Actors Charlie Hunnam and James Scott, entertainers Ant & Dec and footballers Michael Carrick and Alan Shearer were also born in Newcastle. Multiple circumnavigator David Scott Cowper, Nobel Prize winning physicist Peter Higgs, who researched the mass of subatomic particles, and wrestler Neville were born in the city. John Dunn, inventor of the keyed Northumbrian smallpipes, lived and worked in the city. Kathryn Tickell, the celebrated Northumbrian piper and composer, has longstanding associations with Newcastle as a resident, frequent performer at Sage Gateshead and teacher at Newcastle University. Marc Smith (born 1963), French palaeographer, was born in Newcastle. Freddy Shepherd, former chairman of Newcastle United F.C. for ten years, lived in Newcastle upon Tyne until his death in 2017.

International relations
Twin towns – sister cities

Newcastle upon Tyne is twinned with:

 Newcastle, Australia
 Atlanta, Georgia, U.S. (1977)
 Groningen, Netherlands
 Bergen, Norway (1968)
 Gelsenkirchen, Germany (1948)
 Haifa, Israel
 Nancy, France (1954)
 Taiyuan, China (1985, unilaterally terminated by Newcastle upon Tyne in 2022)

Other agreements
Newcastle has a "friendship agreement" with the American city of Little Rock, Arkansas. Since 2003, it has had a "special cooperation agreement" with the Swedish city of Malmö. Furthermore, Newcastle participated in the 1998 summit of worldwide cities named Newcastle, which led to friendship agreements with the following places:

Neuburg an der Donau, Germany
Neuchâtel, Switzerland
Neufchâteau, Vosges, France 
New Castle, Delaware, United States
New Castle, Indiana, United States
New Castle, Pennsylvania, United States
Newcastle-under-Lyme, England
Newcastle, KwaZulu-Natal, South Africa
Shinshiro, Japan

Foreign consulates
The following countries have consular representation in Newcastle: Denmark, Finland, Romania,
Belgium, France, Germany, Iceland, Italy, Norway, and Sweden.

See also

 List of tallest buildings and structures in Newcastle upon Tyne
 List of public art in Newcastle upon Tyne
 List of Freemen of the City of Newcastle upon Tyne
 Duke of Newcastle

References
Citations

Sources

 Tyneside: A History of Newcastle and Gateshead from Earliest Times, Alistair Moffat and George Rosie, Mainstream Publishing (10 November 2005), 
 Tyneside Neighbourhoods: Deprivation, Social Life and Social Behaviour in One British City, Daniel Nettle, Open Book Publishers, (2016), 
 History of Northumberland and Newcastle-upon-Tyne'', Leslie W. Hepple, Phillimore & Co Ltd (1976),

External links

 City of Newcastle upon Tyne website (Newcastle City Council)
 Official NewcastleGateshead Tourism Site
 BBC Tyne BBC Local website

 
Cities in North East England
Metropolitan boroughs of Tyne and Wear
Populated places established in the 2nd century
Port cities and towns in North East England
Port cities and towns of the North Sea
Ports and harbours of Tyne and Wear
Staple ports
County towns in England
Towns in Tyne and Wear
Trading posts of the Hanseatic League